Olivensa is a genus of longhorn beetles of the subfamily Lamiinae, containing the following species:

 Olivensa cephalotes (Pascoe, 1858)
 Olivensa megacephala (Bates, 1866)
 Olivensa mimula Lane, 1965

References

Hemilophini